Moritz Frederick Stehling (born May 25, 1987 in Bonn) is a German professional footballer, who plays in the RFCU Kelmis.

Career
The goalkeeper played for Alemannia Aachen, Roda JC, Union La Calamine, Fortuna Sittard and in the Estonian Meistriliiga, for JK Tammeka Tartu.

Club career

Statistics

References

1987 births
Living people
Sportspeople from Bonn
German footballers
Expatriate footballers in the Netherlands
German expatriates in the Netherlands
Expatriate footballers in Estonia
German expatriate sportspeople in Belgium
Meistriliiga players
Tartu JK Tammeka players
Expatriate footballers in Belgium
Association football goalkeepers
Footballers from North Rhine-Westphalia
German expatriate sportspeople in Estonia